My Destiny may refer to:

My Destiny (Kim English album), or the title song
My Destiny (Yomo album), or the title song
My Destiny (EP), by Leaves' Eyes
"My Destiny" (Katharine McPhee song)
"My Destiny" (Lionel Richie song)
"My Destiny", a song by Lyn from the original soundtrack of South Korean TV series My Love from the Star
My Destiny (Malaysian TV series), 2008–09 TV series
My Destiny (Philippine TV series), 2014 TV series

See also

 
 
 
 Destiny (disambiguation)